Rahmaniyeh-ye Kabi (also Romanized as Raḩīmānīyeh-ye Ka‘bī; also known as Rabaimamyeh, Raḩīmānīyeh, Rahmānia, Raḩmānī-ye Jadīd, and Raḩmanī-ye Ka‘bī) is a village in Gharb-e Karun Rural District, in the Central District of Khorramshahr County, Khuzestan Province, Iran. At the 2006 census, its population was 274, in 55 families.

References 

Populated places in Khorramshahr County